Honoré Mercier III (17 November 1908 – 14 July 1988) was a member of the Legislative Assembly of Quebec, the grandson of Honoré Mercier and the son of Honoré Mercier fils.

Mercier was born in Montreal to Honoré Mercier fils, Liberal MLA and cabinet minister and Jeanne Fréchette.

He was mayor of Léry, Quebec from 1948 to 1950.

He was first elected to the Legislative Assembly in the 1944 Quebec general election for the Quebec Liberal Party.  However, he was defeated in 1948, 1952, and again in 1960.

External links
 

1908 births
1988 deaths
Quebec Liberal Party MNAs